Abundius of Palestrina is a saint of the Christian church. His feast day is celebrated on October 29 in Palestrina.

References

Sources
Holweck, F. G., A Biographical Dictionary of the Saints. St. Louis, MO: B. Herder Book Co. 1924

Christian saints in unknown century
Italian saints
Year of birth missing
Year of death missing